The 1996 Supertaça Cândido de Oliveira was the 18th edition of the Supertaça Cândido de Oliveira, the annual Portuguese football season-opening match contested by the winners of the previous season's top league and cup competitions (or cup runner-up in case the league- and cup-winning club is the same). The 1996 Supertaça Cândido de Oliveira was contested over two legs, and opposed Benfica and Porto of the Primeira Liga. Porto qualified for the SuperCup by winning the 1995–96 Primeira Divisão, whilst Benfica qualified for the Supertaça by winning the 1995–96 Taça de Portugal.

The first leg which took place at the Estádio das Antas, saw Porto defeat Benfica 1–0. The second leg which took place at the Estádio da Luz, saw the Dragões defeat the Encarnados comfortably with a 5–0 away win (6–0 on aggregate) which would grant the Portistas a ninth Supertaça.

First leg

Details

Second leg

Details

References

Supertaça Cândido de Oliveira
1996–97 in Portuguese football
FC Porto matches
S.L. Benfica matches